Jairo Miguel Pérez Morrison (born 10 June 1976) is a Guatemalan former footballer who played as a central defender.

Career
Born in Guatemala City, Pérez played for Deportivo Marquense, Deportivo Petapa and Juventud Retalteca. 

He made seven international appearances for Guatemala, between 1999 and 2000.

References

1976 births
Living people
Guatemalan footballers
Guatemala international footballers
Deportivo Marquense players
Deportivo Petapa players
Juventud Retalteca players
Association football defenders